Cheshmeh Zangi (also Romanized as Cheshmeh Zangī, Chashmeh-i-Zangi, Chashmeh Rangī, and Chashmeh Zangī; also known as Zangīābād) is a village in Momenabad Rural District, in the Central District of Sarbisheh County, South Khorasan Province, Iran. At the 2006 census, its population was 38, in 10 families.

References 

Populated places in Sarbisheh County